Lubao is a territory of Lomami province of the Democratic Republic of the Congo. Its capital is Lubao.

Territories of Lomami Province